Sarcanthopsis warocqueana, commonly known as the goliath orchid, is a large epiphytic or lithophytic orchid from the family Orchidaceae that forms large clumps. It has a long, thick, branched stems, thick, cord-like roots, many leathery, strap-like leaves and many cream-coloured, yellowish or greenish flowers with purple or brown spots. It grows near the sea, in coastal swamps and in rainforest, usually in full sun. It mainly only occurs in New Guinea.

Description
The side lobes are triangular and the middle lobe is fleshy with a spur and a large, fleshy callus. Flowering occurs from April to August.

Taxonomy and naming
The goliath orchid was first formally described in 1891 by Robert Allen Rolfe who gave it the name Stauropsis warocqueana and published the description in Lindenia: iconography of orchids. In 1972, Leslie Andrew Garay changed the name to Sarcanthopsis warocqueana. The specific epithet (warocqueana) honours "M. G. Warocqué", in whose garden it flowered, producing the type specimen.

Distribution and habitat
It is found in eastern New Guinea and nearby islands. A single juvenile plant has been observed on Moa Island, Queensland.

References

Aeridinae
Epiphytic orchids
Endemic orchids of Australia
Orchids of New Guinea
Orchids of Queensland
Plants described in 1891